Sidney Holgate, CBE (9 September 1918 – 17 May 2003) was a British mathematician and academic.

Holgate was schooled at Henry Mellish School and won a scholarship to Hatfield College, Durham, where he studied Mathematics and eventually became Senior Man. He was also President of the Durham Union for Michaelmas term of 1940. Being unacceptable for wartime service on medical grounds, he instead taught for a year at Nottingham High School, before returning to Durham and completing his doctorate in 1945.

He was Master of Grey College, Durham from its foundation in 1959 to 1980. He served as Pro-Vice-Chancellor and Sub-Warden of Durham University from 1964 to 1969.

References

 
 
 
 

1918 births
2003 deaths
Academics of Durham University
Masters of Grey College, Durham
People educated at Henry Mellish Grammar School
20th-century British mathematicians
21st-century British mathematicians
Commanders of the Order of the British Empire
Alumni of Hatfield College, Durham
Presidents of the Durham Union